Patricia Britt "Pat" Hurley (born December 29, 1939) is a former Republican member of the North Carolina House of Representatives She represented the 70th district (including constituents in Randolph County) from 2007 to 2023.

Committee assignments

2021-2022 session
Appropriations (Vice Chair)
Appropriations - Education (Chair)
Education - Community Colleges (Chair)
Families, Children, and Aging Policy (Vice Chair)
Pensions and Retirement
Alcoholic Beverage Control

2019-2020 session
Appropriations (Vice Chair)
Appropriations - Education (Chair)
Education - Community Colleges (Chair)
Families, Children, and Aging Policy (Chair)
Pensions and Retirement (Vice Chair)
Alcoholic Beverage Control
Finance

2017-2018 session
Appropriations (Vice Chair)
Appropriations - Education (Chair)
Aging (Chair)
Judiciary II (Vice Chair)
Pensions and Retirement
Alcoholic Beverage Control
Education - K-12
Health Care Reform
State Personnel

2015-2016 session
Appropriations (Vice Chair)
Appropriations on Justice and Public Safety (Chair)
Aging (Chair)
Judiciary II (Vice Chair)
Pensions and Retirement
Education - K-12
State Personnel

2013-2014 session
Appropriations (Vice Chair)
State Personnel (Vice Chair)
Judiciary
Agriculture
Banking
Health and Human Services

2011-2012 session
Appropriations
State Personnel (Vice Chair)
Health and Human Services
Insurance
Government

2009-2010 session
Appropriations
Pensions and Retirement
Education
Judiciary II
Juvenile Justice
Mental Health Reform

Electoral history

2022

2020

2018

2016

2014

2012

2010

2008

2006

References

Living people
1939 births
People from Asheboro, North Carolina
Republican Party members of the North Carolina House of Representatives
Women state legislators in North Carolina
21st-century American politicians
21st-century American women politicians